The NER Class R (later, LNER Class D20) was a class of 4-4-0 steam locomotive, designed by Wilson Worsdell for the North Eastern Railway.  They passed to the London and North Eastern Railway (LNER) in 1923.  In 1936, some were rebuilt with long-travel piston valves and classified D20/2.  The unrebuilt locomotives were re-classified D20/1.

Numbering
Forty-six D20/1 and three D20/2 locomotives passed to British Railways in 1948 and they were numbered 62340-62397 (with gaps).

Preservation
The last D20 was withdrawn in 1957 and none were preserved.

References

External links
 D20/1 Rail UK
 D20/2 Rail UK
 The W.Worsdell Class D20 (NER Class R) 4-4-0 Locomotives LNER Encyclopedia

R
4-4-0 locomotives
Railway locomotives introduced in 1899
Scrapped locomotives
Standard gauge steam locomotives of Great Britain

Passenger locomotives